Luthrodes boopis is a species of butterflies in the family Lycaenidae. It was formerly Chilades boopis and was described by Hans Fruhstorfer in 1897.

Range
Luthrodes boopis was seen in Indonesia, North Sulawesi and Toli-Toli.

Taxonomy
Luthodes boopis has these following subspecies:

Luthrodes boopis minor (Ribbe,1926)

Luthodes boopis boopis

References 

Polyommatini
Insects described in 1897